Westaflex is a large global HVAC brand, owned by German company Westaflex Holding. The company began in 1933 when Lorenz and Ferdinand Westerbarkey, formerly prisoner of war during the Nazi era developed a coil-based tube forming machine, the first stable and any-shape tube of its kind. The company's owner,  named it Westaflex, from their family name Westerbarkey (meaning Westerflex HVAC products).

Internationalisation during the 1960s propelled the Westaflex brand to a wider global market. With presence in 32 countries on five continents, Westaflex engages in the majority of their business within Europe and North America.

Slogans
Westaflex's motto is "Verbindungen die sich auszahlen" meaning connections which pay in German.  The company also uses the slogan Everything in flexible ducting.

History
Westaflex is a manufacturer of HVAC appliances, commercial equipment, based in Gütersloh, Germany. It was founded as a family business and has always been a privately held, family-owned, family-run company. The respect for co-workers and the environment is part of the German heritage of the company. Wherever Westaflex is located we are engaged in the local social life, either through sponsoring of community activities or actively participating in the daily life of the community (Corporate social responsibility).

Westaflex is a global supplier of automotive and industrial technology and of HVAC consumer goods and building technology. The Westaflex Group comprises some 28 subsidiary companies. One of the cornerstones of the Westaflex Group's product strategy is EDIFACT.

Arrangement of the company
Other companies founded using licences from the Westaflex family business:
Clevaflex, Cleveland Ohio, is independently owned and operated since 1964 supplying Westaflex and Clevaform style convoluted tubing and ducting for the Automotive and HVAC industries
Westaflex US is a manufacturer of Westerflex tubes, based in Santa Barbara.

References 
  (search for 'Aktenzeichen' 39957366.6).

External links
 

Auto parts suppliers of Germany
Engineering companies of Germany
Heating, ventilation, and air conditioning companies
Companies based in North Rhine-Westphalia
Manufacturing companies established in 1933
German brands
Gütersloh